Sithmina is a Sinhala language education paper targeted for Ordinary Level (O/L) students in Sri Lanka. This is the only education paper which publishes weekly according to the O/L Syllabus. It is published by the Associated Newspapers of Ceylon Limited (Lake House), a government-owned corporation. The newspaper commenced publishing in 2012 under the guidance of Lake House Chairman Bandula Padmakumara. The readership is around 200,000 and the circulation is 60,000.

The paper is written as a tabloid, with photographs printed both in color and black and white. Weekly printings include the model papers and lessons for Grade 10 and 11 students.

References

Sinhala-language newspapers published in Sri Lanka